Diego Duarte Delgado (born October 20, 1970 in Bucaramanga, Santander) is a Colombian sport shooter. He won the World Championships in Skeet Men at Lonato World Cup 2003, defeating Eric Wandtdal and Olympic silver medalist Tore Brovold, Diego also is holder of the Panamerican Record with 149/150, He won a bronze medal in men's skeet shooting at the 2003 Pan American Games in Santo Domingo, Dominican Republic, with a total score of 148 points.

Duarte made his official debut for the 2004 Summer Olympics in Athens, where he placed fifteenth in men's skeet shooting, with a total score of 120 points, tying his position with five other shooters, including Russia's Valeriy Shomin and Australia's Paul Rahman.

At the 2008 Summer Olympics in Beijing, Duarte competed for the second time, as a 38-year-old, in men's skeet shooting. He finished only in thirty-eighth place by three points behind Qatar's Rashid Hamad from the final attempt, for a total score of 106 points.

References

External links
NBC Olympics Profile

Colombian male sport shooters
Skeet shooters
Living people
Olympic shooters of Colombia
Shooters at the 2004 Summer Olympics
Shooters at the 2008 Summer Olympics
People from Bucaramanga
Sportspeople from Valle del Cauca Department
1970 births
Shooters at the 2015 Pan American Games
Pan American Games bronze medalists for Colombia
Pan American Games medalists in shooting
Medalists at the 2003 Pan American Games